Bochkaryovka is a rural locality (a selo) in Tomsky Selsoviet of Seryshevsky District, Amur Oblast, Russia. The population was 1,049 as of 2018. There are  8 streets.

Geography 
Bochkaryovka is located 19 km south of Seryshevo (the district's administrative centre) by road. Tomskoye is the nearest rural locality.

References 

Rural localities in Seryshevsky District